Queen of Latin Soul, also known as Reina De La Cancion Latina is an album by La Lupe. It was released by Tico Records in 1968 (catalog no. LP-1167). The album was produced by Pancho Cristal and arranged and conducted by Hector de Leon.

The album included La Lupe's hit version of the song, "Fever". On the web site NBCNewYork.com Elizabeth Bougerol called it one of the best versions and essential at Boogaloo parties.

Track listing
Side A
 "Amor Gitano" (Hector Flores Osuna) [2:55]
 "La Tirana" (A. Curet Alonso) [3:03]
 "Aun" (Ramon Marrero) [2:15]
 "Tu Me Niegas" (J. B. Tarraza) [3:45]
 "Negrura" (Luis Cisneros) [2:35]

Side B
 "Fever" (John Davenport, Eddie Cooley) [2:38]
 "Este Ritmo Sabroson" (Wm. Garcia) [1:46]
 "Busamba" (A. Curet Alonso) [2:50]
 "Soy Sonerita" (Lupe Yoli) [2:20]
 "Mangulina Chismecito" (Ramon Marrero) [2:16]

References

1968 albums
Tico Records albums